SS Cape Florida (AK-5071) was laid down 29 December 1969, as SS LASH Turkiye, a United States Maritime Administration type (C8-S-81b) hull under Maritime Administration contract (MA 229) at Avondale Industries Corp., New Orleans.  She was launched, 10 October 1970 and delivered to the Maritime Administration, 12 September 1973, for operation by Prudential Grace Line.  She was acquired by Delta Line and renamed SS Delta Caribe and SS American Caribe respectively.  She was reacquired by the Maritime Administration for assignment to the Ready Reserve Fleet (RRF) on 17 February 1987 where she was berthed at Beaumont, Texas.   When activated Cape Florida was assigned to the Military Sealift Command (MSC) as one of the Military Sealift Command's four LASH Ready Reserve Force Ships and could be activated in 10 days.  She was removed from MSC control, withdrawn from the RRF by reassignment to the National Defense Reserve Fleet, 28 July 2006.

References 
 SS Cape Florida (AK-5071)

External links 
 National Defense Reserve Fleet Inventory

285904157143

Ships built in Bridge City, Louisiana
1970 ships